The University of Wisconsin–Eau Claire Blugolds (casually known as the UW-Eau Claire Blugolds) are the athletic teams of the University of Wisconsin–Eau Claire. The Blugolds athletic teams compete in NCAA Division III.

National championships

Team

Individual teams

Football

The Blugolds Have won ten conference titles.

Basketball

Cross country
The Blugolds have been national champions in cross country (1984, 2009, 2015).

Ice hockey

The Blugolds have been national champions in Ice Hockey (1984, 2013).

Notable athletes
 Roman Brumm, NFL player
 Ryan Brunt, curling athlete
 Kevin Fitzgerald, NFL player
 Alex Hicks, NHL player
 Paul Menard, NASCAR driver
 Mike Ratliff, NBA player
 Frank Schade, NBA player
 Lee Weigel, NFL player
 Reed Zuehlke, Olympic athlete

References